Per Johan Sebastian Rajalakso (born 23 September 1988) is a Swedish footballer who plays as a midfielder for United IK Nordic.

Career
Rajalakso joined Djurgårdens IF in the beginning of 2008 from Enköpings SK. He made his debut against IFK Norrköping on March 30, 2008, scoring the 2-0 goal. During his time at Djurgården, he has usually been employed as a left winger in a 4-4-2 formation, but he has also been used as a central attacker in a 4-3-3 system.

He started the 2008 season by scoring in the first five games in the Swedish first league.

In early 2009, Rajalakso was called up to the Swedish U21 squad, taking part in two games against Belgium.

In 2014 Rajalakso played in Polish club Jagiellonia Białystok.

Personal life 
Rajalakso was born in Sweden to a Finnish father and Swedish mother. He is the older brother of fellow footballer Joel Rajalakso.

Career statistics

References

External links
 
 

1988 births
Living people
People from Enköping Municipality
Sportspeople from Uppsala County
Swedish people of Finnish descent
Swedish footballers
Sweden under-21 international footballers
Sweden youth international footballers
Allsvenskan players
Superettan players
Enköpings SK players
Djurgårdens IF Fotboll players
Jagiellonia Białystok players
GIF Sundsvall players
Syrianska FC players
Swedish expatriate footballers
Expatriate footballers in Poland
Swedish expatriate sportspeople in Poland
Association football midfielders
Ekstraklasa players